Asadabad (also Romanized as Asadābād) is a village in Sarab Rural District, Giyan District, Nahavand County, Hamadan Province, Iran. At the 2006 census, its population was 389, in 80 families.

References 

Populated places in Nahavand County